Shin Da-hae  (born 13 November 1988) is a South Korean snowboarder.
 
She competed in the 2005, 2009, 2011, 2013, 2015 and 2017 FIS Snowboard World Championships, and in the 2018 Winter Olympics, in parallel giant slalom.

References

External links

1988 births
Living people
South Korean female snowboarders 
Olympic snowboarders of South Korea
Snowboarders at the 2018 Winter Olympics 
Asian Games medalists in snowboarding
Snowboarders at the 2017 Asian Winter Games
Asian Games bronze medalists for South Korea
Medalists at the 2017 Asian Winter Games
21st-century South Korean women